Directors UK (previously DPRS) is the professional association for British directors working in the audiovisual sector, with over 8,000 members. The organisation is both a collective management organisation for the distribution of secondary rights payments to directors, and the campaigning body seeking to protect and enhance the rights of directors in the UK.

Purpose
Directors UK works to protect and enhance the creative rights of directors working in the UK. It strives to ensure directors retain control of their material, and protect them from bad working practices.

Directors UK represents directors and directing to Government in the UK and in Europe, to broadcasters, to regulators, to other industry bodies and to the media.

Governance
In 2020, Andy Harrower was appointed CEO of Directors UK. Directors UK is a governed by an elected Board of Directors drawn from its membership. In 2021, the most recent Board was elected by the Directors UK membership – the Board members are:

 Karen Kelly - Directors UK Chair
 James Hawes - Directors UK Vice-Chair
 Anna Thomson – Directors UK Vice-Chair
 Abigail Dankwa
 Avril Evans
 Zoe Hines
 Jessica Hobbs
 Alexander Jacob - Nations and Regions Representative
 Alex Kalymnios
 Tinge Krishnan
 Lisi Russell – Successor Member Representative
 Carolyn Saunders – Associate Member Representative

Membership
Directors UK offers three membership categories in total: 
Full: For directors working in film and television whose work is eligible under the Directors UK Distribution Scheme;
Associate: For directors working in film and television whose work is not eligible under the Directors UK Distribution Scheme, and directors who work outside of film and television, e.g. music videos, commercials;
Distribution-only: For directors whose work is eligible under the Directors UK Distribution Scheme, but who do not wish to access organisational benefits and services.

References

Entertainment industry unions
Film organisations in the United Kingdom
Media and communications in the London Borough of Camden
Organisations based in the London Borough of Camden
Television organisations in the United Kingdom